Grosvenor Bridge, originally known as, and alternatively called Victoria Railway Bridge, is a railway bridge over the River Thames in London, between Vauxhall Bridge and Chelsea Bridge. Originally constructed in 1860, and widened in 1865 and 1907, the bridge was extensively rebuilt and widened again in the 1960s as an array of ten parallel bridges. There are now eight tracks across the bridge.

History
The original bridge was constructed in the mid-nineteenth century in two stages: the first bridge was built by the Victoria Station and Pimlico Railway between 1859 and 1860 at a cost of £84,000 to carry two tracks into Victoria Station; it was the first railway bridge across the Thames in central London.  The engineer was Sir John Fowler.

The bridge was widened by four tracks on the eastern side for the London, Brighton and South Coast Railway and London, Chatham and Dover Railway between 1865 and 1866, at a cost of £245,000.  Sir Charles Fox was the engineer.

In 1907 the bridge was widened again with a further track, on the western side, for the London, Brighton and South Coast Railway.

In 1963–67, the structure of the bridge was completely renewed and modernized, leaving only the cores of the original piers. At the same time, a tenth track was added in a space formerly used for gas mains. To minimize disruption to traffic, each track was renewed separately, and put back into service before the next one was closed.  The designer for this work was Freeman Fox & Partners, and the project engineer was A. H. Cantrell, chief civil engineer of the Southern Region of British Rail.
It was said to be the busiest railway bridge in the world with 1000 trains crossing per day in 1968.

Location
On the north bank is Pimlico to the north and east and Chelsea to the west; the Lister Hospital and the Royal Chelsea Hospital lie immediately to the north west. On the south bank is Nine Elms to the east and Battersea to the west. Battersea Power Station is immediately to the south of the bridge, and Battersea Park to the south west.

See also
Crossings of the River Thames
List of bridges in London

Notes

References

Sources

 

, republished with permission via https://sremg.org.uk
 Video of 1960s reconstruction

Further reading

External links

 
 
Where Thames Smooth Waters Glide

Bridges completed in 1860
Bridges completed in 1967
Railway bridges in London
Bridges across the River Thames
Buildings and structures in the London Borough of Wandsworth
Buildings and structures in the City of Westminster
Transport in the London Borough of Wandsworth
Transport in the City of Westminster
Bridge light displays